The Battle of Senluo Temple was a clash between members of the "Militia United in Righteousness" (better known as the "Boxers") and Qing government troops that took place on October 18, 1899, near a temple located on the western edge of Pingyuan County in northwestern Shandong. The Boxers were armed with swords, spears and a few hunting rifles. In a first skirmish they inflicted a few casualties on Qing troops and forced them to retreat, but the Qing army won the battle in a counterattack during which at least 27 Boxers were killed. After the Shandong authorities caught and executed the Boxer leaders in the following months, the Boxer movement died off in the immediate area, partly because local peasants could see that the Boxers' invulnerability rituals did not work. However, thanks to its non-centralized organization and driven by widespread support for its anti-Christian activities, the Boxer movement continued to spread quickly, culminating in the Boxer Rebellion that engulfed northern China in the spring and summer of 1900.

The Battle of Senluo Temple was a "watershed" in the history of the Boxer movement and marked its "final maturation." For the first time, the Boxers called themselves the "Militia United in Righteousness" instead of "Boxers [or "Fists": 拳, ] United in Righteousness," hoping to use their new name to distance themselves from proscribed martial arts sects and to give themselves the legitimacy of a group that defended orthodoxy. The battle was also the first time the Boxers' slogan of "Support the Qing, destroy the foreign"--by which they announced their intention to support the reigning dynasty and get rid of foreign influence--gained prominence. Finally, the clash attracted the support of influential officials and Manchu princes at the imperial court, who started to see the Boxers as possible allies against the increased imperialist activities that had been triggered by the Juye Incident two years earlier.

Notes

Bibliography

.
.
.
.

1899 in China
Senluo Temple
Senluo Temple
Senluo Temple
October 1899 events